Lucky You may refer to:
Lucky You (novel), a 1997 novel by Carl Hiaasen
Lucky You (theatre adaptation), theatre adaptation of the novel
Lucky You (film), a 2007 film starring Eric Bana and Drew Barrymore set in the world of professional poker
"Lucky You" (song), by Eminem featuring Joyner Lucas from Kamikaze
"Lucky You", a song by The Lightning Seeds from Jollification
"Lucky You", a song by The National from Sad Songs for Dirty Lovers 
Lucky You, a cologne by Lucky Brand Jeans